The 1969 Jacksonville State Gamecocks football team represented Jacksonville State University as a member of the Alabama Collegiate Conference (ACC) during the 1969 NAIA football season. Led by first-year head coach Charley Pell, the Gamecocks compiled an overall record of 3–6 with a mark of 0–3 in conference play.

Schedule

References

Jacksonville State
Jacksonville State Gamecocks football seasons
Jacksonville State Gamecocks football